John Howard (born August 16, 1947 in Springfield, Missouri) is an Olympic cyclist from the United States, who set a land speed record of 152.2 miles per hour (245 km/h) while motor-pacing on a pedal bicycle on July 20, 1985 on Utah's Bonneville Salt Flats. This record was beaten in 1995 by Fred Rompelberg. 

A competitor at the 1968, 1972, and 1976 Summer Olympics, Howard won the gold medal in the 1971 Pan American Games road cycling race in Cali, Colombia, as a member of the U.S. Army cycling team by beating Luis Carlos Florez in a sprint finish. He is a former 4-time U.S. National Road Cycling champion (1968, 1972, 1973 and 1975) and won the 1981 Ironman Triathlon World Championship in Hawaii.  Howard won the first two editions of the Red Zinger Bicycle Classic stage race in Colorado in 1975 and 1976.

In 1982, Howard was one of four competitors in the inaugural Race Across America RAAM, eventually finishing second.

In 1989, John Howard appeared in an instructional videotape produced by New & Unique Videos of San Diego, California, entitled "Ultimate Mountain Biking: Advanced Techniques & Winning Strategies" in which he demonstrated proper stretching and training techniques.  In 1991 John Howard produced a video with New & Unique Videos partners Mark Schulze and Patty Mooney, entitled "John Howard's Lessons in Cycling."  This instructional videotape featured Jeff Pierce, Marianne Berglund, Martin Graf, Paula Newby-Fraser and Sports Nutritionist Dr. Nick Martin.  "Lessons in Cycling" earned a Bronze Telly and a Silver Medal at the International Film & TV Festival in New York.

John Howard has trained several cyclists over the years including working with Denise Mueller-Korenek, who set the paced bicycle land speed record on Sept. 16, 2018, at the Bonneville Salt Flats.

See also
 Cycling records

References

External links
 152 MPH Pedal Bicycle
 Ultracycling: Hall of Fame - John Howard
 Wielersite Profile
  John Howard Appears on Mountain Bike Helmet Cam Clip in Southern California
  John Howard on Bicycling and the Law

1947 births
Living people
American male cyclists
Cyclists at the 1968 Summer Olympics
Cyclists at the 1972 Summer Olympics
Cyclists at the 1976 Summer Olympics
Ironman world champions
Olympic cyclists of the United States
Sportspeople from Springfield, Missouri
American male triathletes
Pan American Games gold medalists for the United States
Pan American Games medalists in cycling
American cyclo-cross champions
Cyclists at the 1971 Pan American Games
Medalists at the 1971 Pan American Games
Cyclists from Missouri
Cyclo-cross cyclists